

Composition of the troupe of the Comédie-Française in 1772 
The theatrical year began 12 April 1772 and ended 16 April 1773.

Source
 Les Spectacles de Paris, ou Calendrier historique & chronologique des théâtres, pour l'année 1772, Paris 1772.

1772
1772 in France